Bing Crosby Sings with Judy Garland, Mary Martin, Johnny Mercer is a Decca Records compilation album of phonograph records by Bing Crosby, Judy Garland, Mary Martin and Johnny Mercer.

Background
Bing Crosby had enjoyed unprecedented success during the 1940s with his discography showing six No. 1 hits in 1944 alone. His films such as Going My Way and The Bells of St. Mary's were huge successes as were the Road films he made with Bob Hope. On radio, his Kraft Music Hall and Philco Radio Time shows were very popular. Decca Records built on this by issuing a number of 78rpm album sets, some featuring freshly recorded material and others utilizing Crosby's back catalogue. Ten of these sets were released in 1946, nine in 1947 and nine more in 1948. 
  
Bing Crosby Sings with Judy Garland, Mary Martin, Johnny Mercer includes several songs which had already been hits – "Small Fry" and "Mr. Gallagher and Mr. Shean" – had charted in 1938 and "Yah-Ta-Ta, Yah-Ta-Ta" reached No. 5 in 1945.

Reception
The reviewer for Billboard said:
Second in series of Decca packages with triple-talent peg featuring der Bingle's former vocal wax compatriots. All disks are former single releases but album as a whole should appeal to all who are Crosby fans (who ain't). Particularly valuable and as rhythmically appealing as when they first came out are the Mercer team-ups with Gallagher-Shean version of "Mr. Crosby and Mr. Mercer"; "Small Fry," "On Behalf of the Visiting Firemen." In fact whole album sparkles with the xairy, wunnerful Crosby touch.

Track listing
These songs were featured on a five 10" 78 rpm album set, Decca Album No. A-631.

References 

Bing Crosby compilation albums
Decca Records compilation albums
1948 compilation albums
Vocal duet albums